This is a list of diplomatic missions of Zimbabwe, excluding honorary consulates. Following Ian Smith's Unilateral Declaration of Independence from the United Kingdom in 1965 Rhodesia's diplomatic presence was dramatically rolled back across the world.  By the time of the Lancaster House Agreement in 1979 Rhodesia only had representative offices in London, Bonn, Pretoria, Washington, D.C. and Tokyo.  Missions in Maputo (then Lourenço Marques) and Lisbon were closed in 1975 following the Carnation Revolution in Portugal.  Under Robert Mugabe Zimbabwe ran a new foreign policy which operated more closely with African, Soviet and NAM states.

Current missions

Africa

America

Asia

Europe

Oceania

Multilateral organizations

Gallery

Closed missions

Europe

See also
 Foreign relations of Zimbabwe
 Visa policy of Zimbabwe

References

Notes

Citations

External links
 Ministry of Foreign Affairs of Zimbabwe

 
Diplomatic missions
Zimbabwe